Cashmere (French: cachemire) is an oil painting by the American artist John Singer Sargent, currently in a private collection. It was completed in c.1908. The dimensions of the painting are 71.1 by 109.2 centimeters (28.0 in × 43.0 in).

Description 
The painting is of Sargent's niece, Reine Ormond, in an exotic cashmere shawl in seven different poses. Reine would have been about 11 years old. It was painted by Sargent when he was on holiday in the Italian Alps. Though the style is quite different, the representation of successive moments of a movement resembles Marcel Duchamp's Nude Descending a Staircase of 1912.

References

External links
Article July 6, 2015 in New Zealand Herald

1908 paintings
Paintings by John Singer Sargent